Sally-Billy House is a historic plantation house located at Halifax, Halifax County, North Carolina. It was built about 1804, and consists of a two-story, one bay, pedimented central block flanked by two-bay one-story wings.  The frame dwelling is sheathed in weatherboard.  The house was moved to its present location in December 1974.

It was listed on the National Register of Historic Places in 1973.

References

External links

Plantation houses in North Carolina
Historic American Buildings Survey in North Carolina
Houses on the National Register of Historic Places in North Carolina
Federal architecture in North Carolina
Houses completed in 1804
Houses in Halifax County, North Carolina
National Register of Historic Places in Halifax County, North Carolina
Buildings and structures in Halifax, North Carolina